Divaricella dentata, or the dentate lucine, is a species of bivalve mollusc in the family Lucinidae. It can be found along the coast of the West Indies.

References

Lucinidae
Bivalves described in 1815
Taxa named by William Wood (zoologist)